Fanta, Lady Singhateh, CRG, also known as Fatou Fanta Basse Sagnia or Sagniang (born 13 July 1929, Janjanburah) is a former First Lady of the Gambia.

Biography 

Singahteh was born in Georgetown, modern Janjanbureh, The Gambia, on 13 July 1929. In 1949, she married Sir Farimang Singhateh, then medical officer, but future Governor-General of the Gambia. They had six children together. She and her husband, who were both Ahmadiyya, went on the Hajj - the pilgrimage to Mecca in 1964.

Politics 

Singhateh and her husband were early members of the People's Progressive Party, which was founded in 1959. As part of their work within the party, they campaigned for the end of colonialism. 

Singhateh herself was known as a radical within the party. Prior to her marriage, Singhateh was an activist and was of the first people to receive charitable shipments of second-hand clothing from Belgium to distribute in regions like Bakoteh, Sukuta and rural villages.

Singhateh served as First Lady of the Gambia from 1966-1970, when her husband was the Governor-General of the Gambia. They both the first Gambians to be in those posts, he as Governor-General, she as First Lady. In her role, she  was concerned with welfare and encouraged philanthropic schemes aimed at supporting women. She was a strong advocate of communal, cultural and social development.

In her 90s, she opened a bakery providing low cost products, enabling everyone to buy bread.

Awards 

In 2012, Singhateh became a Commander in the Order of the Republic of the Gambia (CRG). When her husband was awarded a knighthood by Queen Elizabeth II, Singhateh could adopt the title Lady, and became known to many in the Gambia as 'Lady Fanta'.

References

External links 
 Sir Farimang Singhateh Foundation

Living people
Gambian Muslims
First ladies of the Gambia
Gambian Ahmadis
1929 births
People from Central River Division
Janjanbureh
Wives of knights